John Claude Bidgood (12 May 1914 – 17 August 2001) was a British Conservative Party politician.

He was elected at the 1955 general election as Member of Parliament (MP) for Bury and Radcliffe. Bidgood was re-elected at the 1959 election, but at the 1964 general election he lost his seat to Labour's David Ensor.

References

External links 
 

1914 births
2001 deaths
Conservative Party (UK) MPs for English constituencies
UK MPs 1955–1959
UK MPs 1959–1964